Megalonycta is a genus of moths of the family Noctuidae. The genus was erected by Pierre Viette in 1965.

Species
Megalonycta mediovitta (Rothschild, 1924) Madagascar, Comoros
Megalonycta adelphica (A. E. Prout, 1927) São Tomé
Megalonycta forsteri Laporte, 1979 Ethiopia, Kenya, Tanzania
Megalonycta kissa Bippus, 2020 from Reunion
Megalonycta inversa (Gaede, 1915) Tanzania
Megalonycta paragrapha (Felder & Rogenhofer, 1874) South Africa, Zimbabwe, Tanzania

References

Viette, P. (1965). "Descriptions préliminaires de nouveaux genres et espèces de Noctuidae Amphipyrinae malgaches (Lep.)". Bulletin de la Société entomologique de France. 70: 85–91.

Hadeninae
Moth genera
Taxa named by Pierre Viette